Samayasāra (The Nature of the Self) is a famous Jain text composed by Acharya Kundakunda in 439 verses. Its ten chapters discuss the nature of Jīva (pure self/soul), its attachment to Karma and Moksha (liberation). Samayasāra expounds the Jain concepts like Karma, Asrava (influx of karmas), Bandha (Bondage), Samvara (stoppage), Nirjara (shedding) and Moksha (complete annihilation of karmas).

History
Samayasara was written by Acharya Kundakunda in Prakrit.

Contents
The original Samayasara of Kundakunda consists of 415 verses and was written in Prakrit. The first verse (aphorism) of the Samayasāra is an invocation:  According to Samayasāra, the real self is only that soul which has achieved ratnatraya i.e. Samyak Darshan, Samyak Gyan and Samyak Charitra. These state when soul achieves purity is Arihant and Siddha. It can be achieved by victory over five senses. According to Samayasāra:

Commentaries
It has a number of commentaries on it. Atmakhyati or Samayasara Kalasha, written by Acharya Amritchandra in 12th century CE, is a 278-verse Sanskrit commentary. Samaysar Kalash Tika or Balbodh was written by Pande Rajmall or Raymall in 16th century CE. It is a commentary of Amritchandra's Samaysar Kalasha. Nataka Samayasara is a commentary on Rajmall's version which was written by Banarasidas in Braj Bhasha in 17th century CE.

See also 
 Sarvārthasiddhi
 Moksha (Jainism)

References

Citations

Sources
 
 
 
 
 
 

Prakrit Jain texts
Eastern philosophical literature
Ancient Indian literature
Jain texts